Kuakata Ecopark is an ecopark of Bangladesh, located on Kalapara Upazila of Patuakhali District.

Gallery

References

.

Forestry in Bangladesh
Protected areas of Bangladesh